Albert Contreras (1933-June 17, 2017) was an artist and painter based in Santa Monica, California known for gestural and geometric abstraction. Contreras painted from around 1960 to 1972, and then stopped painting for 25 years. He resumed painting in 1997. Contreras has donated many of his works to museums and university galleries.

Gallery 
{|
| 
|

References

Further reading

External links 
 Albert Contreras at Bill Maynes - New York - Painting Exhibition from Art in America
 Albert Contreras Demonstrates How to Paint a Large X

Artists from California
1933 births
2017 deaths
20th-century American painters
American male painters
21st-century American painters
20th-century American male artists